Mugford may refer to:

Ships
USS Mugford (DD-105), a destroyer launched in 1918 and decommissioned in 1922
USS Mugford (DD-389), a destroyer that served in World War II

People
Harold Sandford Mugford (1894–1958), English recipient of the Victoria Cross
James Mugford (1749–1776), captain in the U.S. Continental Navy
Julie Mugford, a key prosecution witness in the White House Farm murders trial

See also
Mogford, a surname